After the 1880 census, a tenth seat in the United States House of Representatives was added to Virginia's nine districts.  For the 48th Congress (March 4, 1883 – March 4, 1885), that seat was elected at-large statewide.  In 1885, Virginia redistricted its seats into ten geographic districts, thereby eliminating the at-large seat.

For the 73rd Congress (March 4, 1933 – January 3, 1935), Virginia elected all of its representatives at-large (i.e., statewide).  The district format returned in the election to the 74th Congress (January 3, 1935 – January 3, 1937) and has remained in effect ever since.

List of members representing the district

References

 Congressional Biographical Directory of the United States 1774–present

At-large
Former congressional districts of the United States
At-large United States congressional districts
Constituencies established in 1883
Constituencies disestablished in 1885
1883 establishments in Virginia
1885 disestablishments in Virginia
Constituencies established in 1933
Constituencies disestablished in 1935
1933 establishments in Virginia
1935 disestablishments in Virginia